Annedy Kwamasi Kundu (born 17 December 1996), known as Annette Kundu, is a Kenyan footballer who plays as a goalkeeper for the Kenya women's national team.

International career
Kundu capped for Kenya at senior level during the 2019 CECAFA Women's Championship.

See also
List of Kenya women's international footballers

References

1996 births
Living people
People from Kakamega
Kenyan women's footballers
Women's association football goalkeepers
Kenya women's international footballers
Kenyan expatriate  footballers
Kenyan expatriates in Cyprus
Expatriate women's footballers in Cyprus